Scott County is a county located in the U.S. state of Arkansas. As of the 2020 census, the population was 9,836. The county seat is Waldron. Scott County is Arkansas' 28th county, formed on November 5, 1833, and named for Andrew Scott, a justice of the Supreme Court of the Arkansas Territory. It is an alcohol-prohibited or dry county.

Geography

Major highways
 Future Interstate 49
 U.S. Highway 71
 U.S. Highway 270
 Highway 23
 Highway 28
 Highway 80
 Highway 250

Adjacent counties
Sebastian County (northwest)
Logan County (northeast)
Yell County (east)
Montgomery County (southeast)
Polk County (south)
Le Flore County, Oklahoma (west)

National protected area
 Ouachita National Forest (part)

Demographics

2020 census

As of the 2020 United States census, there were 9,836 people, 3,944 households, and 2,569 families residing in the county.

2000 census
As of the 2000 census, there were 10,996 people, 4,323 households, and 3,121 families residing in the county.  The population density was 12 people per square mile (5/km2).  There were 4,924 housing units at an average density of 6 per square mile (2/km2).  The racial makeup of the county was 93.53% White, 0.23% Black or African American, 1.40% Native American, 0.95% Asian, 0.01% Pacific Islander, 2.56% from other races, and 1.32% from two or more races.  5.71% of the population were Hispanic or Latino of any race.

There were 4,323 households, out of which 32.6% had children under the age of 18 living with them, 59.5% were married couples living together, 8.5% had a female householder with no husband present, and 27.8% were non-families. 24.8% of all households were made up of individuals, and 11.4% had someone living alone who was 65 years of age or older.  The average household size was 2.52 and the average family size was 2.98.

In the county, the population was spread out, with 26.5% under the age of 18, 8.1% from 18 to 24, 26.5% from 25 to 44, 24.2% from 45 to 64, and 14.7% who were 65 years of age or older.  The median age was 37 years. For every 100 females there were 101.9 males.  For every 100 females age 18 and over, there were 96.6 males.

The median income for a household in the county was $26,412, and the median income for a family was $30,311. Males had a median income of $23,118 versus $17,127 for females. The per capita income for the county was $13,609.  About 15.3% of families and 18.2% of the population were below the poverty line, including 21.2% of those under age 18 and 14.1% of those age 65 or over.

As of 2010 Scott County had a population of 11,233.  The racial makeup was 85.35% white, 0.47% black, 1.85% Native American, 3.42% Asian, 2.12% Non-Hispanics reporting more than one race and 6.96% Hispanics or Latinos.

Government
Scott County is represented the Arkansas House of Representatives by the Republicans Marcus Richmond, a businessman from Harvey, and Jon Eubanks, a farmer and Certified Public Accountant from Paris.
Over the past few election cycles Scott County has trended heavily towards the GOP. The last Democrat (as of 2020) to carry this county was Bill Clinton in 1996.

Communities

Cities
Mansfield
Waldron (county seat)

Census-designated places
Boles

Townships

 Black Fork
 Blansett
 Brawley
 Cauthron
 Cedar
 Coal
 Denton
 Hickman (Waldron)
 Hon
 Hunt
 James
 Jones
 Keener
 La Faye
 Lafayette
 Lamb
 Lewis (Mansfield)
 Little Texas
 Mill Creek
 Mountain
 Mount Pleasant
 Oliver
 Parks
 Tate
 Tomlinson

See also
 List of lakes in Scott County, Arkansas
 National Register of Historic Places listings in Scott County, Arkansas

References

External links
 Scott County, Arkansas entry on the Encyclopedia of Arkansas History & Culture
 Scott County official website

 
1833 establishments in Arkansas Territory
Populated places established in 1833